In dinghy sailing, a boat is said to be turtling or to turn turtle when the boat is fully inverted with the mast pointing down to the lake bottom, riverbed, or seabed. The name stems from the appearance of the upside-down boat, similar to the carapace (top shell) of a sea turtle. The term can be applied to any vessel; turning turtle is less frequent but more dangerous on ships than on smaller boats. It is rarer but more hazardous for multihulls than for monohulls, because of multihulls are harder to flip in both directions. Measures can be taken to prevent a capsize (where the boat is knocked over on its beam-ends but not yet inverted) from becoming a turtle (with bottom up).

Definition and prevention

When a boat is "turned over completely" it has turned turtle. Some sources treat the term "turtle" as synonymous with "capsize" or "keel over". but most others make a distinction. Carrying too much sail or loss of control can lead to broachingthe boat heels too far to one side, or capsizes. While all turtlings involve a capsize, the converse is untrue. Prevention is the first priority. 

With the exception of self-righting watercraft, vessels have an angle of vanishing stability (AVS). External forces aside, if they are tilted at an angle less than the AVS, they will pop back upright. If they are tilted at an angle greater than the AVS, they will turn turtle and stay there. In other words, non-self-righting vessels are stable when turtled. Their primary stability and secondary stability are greater than zero, tending to right them, but their tertiary or inverted stability is less than zero, and tends to keep them upside-down.

Capsizing (but not necessarily turtling) is an inherent part of dinghy sailing, and is considered to be "routine". It is not a question of "if" but a question of "when". 

For those who prefer to avoid the experience, a keelboat monohull has physics on its side. (See limit of positive stability.) But even yachts can capsize and turtle in extraordinary conditions, so design considerations and suitability for particular tasks, locations, weather, duration and situations are essential queries. "Such events can overcome skill and experience"; boats need to be appropriate for foreseeable conditions. It is a fundamental question of seaworthiness.

Turtling commonly occurs when a boat capsizes and is not righted or attended to in time, allowing it to roll through the approximately 90 degrees of a capsize through to 180 degrees from upright.

Prevention and delay of turtling in dinghies is the highest priorityturtling can be catastrophic in consequencesbut it depends on skill, ability and athleticism, which vary greatly. As John Rousmaniere wrote: Testing confirms the Royal Yachting Association's conclusion that "a decisive way to address entrapment is to immediately right the boat by putting weight on the centerboard", daggerboard, (or bilgeboard in a scow). His 2012 report advises that "US Sailing and other organizations should consider establishing this as doctrine." Thus, reliance on boat handling and seamanship may be misplaced.

Sealing masts and attaching flotation are effective preventatives for turtling of dinghys, but not widely utilized. More certain preventatives for this includes various forms of flotation added to the tip of the mast or top of the mainsail. These include floats (e.g., one that looks like a streamlined blimp used on Hobie 16s) or a "sail patch"a sleeve with built in flotation that fits over the top of the sail, available for example as option on the Wayfarer (dinghy) Mark IV. Another alternative is to seal the mast, thereby increasing its buoyancy.

As an emergency palliative, putting flotation (i.e., a spare life vest or other personal flotation device), onto the end of the mast straight away after a capsize and without delay, can forestall a turtle.  Conversely, climbing onto the side of a knocked down boat can increase the likelihood of turtling, as it moves weight higher over the center of gravity, may also increase windage, and thus can effectively drive the mast downward.

Several devices have been patented to prevent turtling. Capsizing is particularly troublesome for catamarans and trimarans, which are especially hard to right.

The use of a trapeze, harness, jackline or other tether can cause injury or death due to entrapment if a boat turtles.

Practice and cure

Righting a turtled dinghy is one of the most difficult maneuvers.  Recovery in a monohull requires releasing the main sheet and jib sheet, lowering the spinnaker if it is deployed, standing on the bottom of the boat and levering on the centerboard, or standing on the centerboard (there may be weight and placement restrictions).  It is important that other members of the crew not be on top the boat, as this can drastically increase resistance to righting the craft. The use of "righting ropes" materially aids the process. Standing on the centerboard and "piggybacking" of crew members can be highly effective to right a turtled dinghy, as it increases both the weight and leverage being applied.  Use of powerboats to aid is problematical, and depending on the technique usedthere are severalmay or may not succeed. See Capsize. Rigging righting lines depends upon proper placement, and critically should be done in advance of the need to use them.

Multihulls

In yacht sailing, multihulls are deemed to be more prone to turtling than keeled monohulls, and there is essentially no way to right them if they overturn. The juxtaposition of the hulls and sail when turtledit makes them inherently stable when invertedmakes them especially resistant to righting. Consequently, some larger multihulls are built with a turtle emergency escape hatch beneath the hull. Indeed, some locales require such safety hatches. There are, however, those who feel that the likelihood of a capsize of a large multihull is overrated. There are others who state that a self-righting multihull is the answer, along with designing in safety and proper operation. A patent has been issued specifically concerning righting of turtled large multihulls. It is intended to avoid the necessity to use divers and special equipment in a recovery.

It is, however, possible (and often successfully) to right a capsized small multihull, e.g., a Beachcat and Hobie 16. The process begins with positioning ropes so that the crew can get leverage (acting together is key). Righting Beach catamarans that are turtled can be extremely difficult. Loss of sails, rigging, masts and boats can occur, not to mention sailors. A singled-handed self-rescue can be assisted by filling a garbage bag (called in this context a "righting bag") with water, and throwing it over the rescuer's shoulder. See Hobie 16 which suggests sitting on the rear of one sponson, which will upturn a turtled Hobie.

Even some large multihulls can be righted at seait is a long shotprovided that the skipper is well prepared, knows what they are doing, and has appropriate devices, tools, skills, a workable plan, cooperative waves, weather and wind, and some luck.

Notable events

The Fastnet race, and particularly the 1979 Fastnet race (the disastrous race that changed yacht racing for all time), has been the occasion for many sailboat capsizes, turtlings and fatalities. In the 1979 race, "15 sailors died, five boats sank, and at least 75 boats flipped upside down." In any event, adopting heaving to as a storm tactic proved to be a good preventive of capsize during the race.  Not one of the hove to yachts were capsized or suffered any serious damage. See also Capsize of Drum (1985) and Capsize of Rambler (2011), both of which involved large Maxi yachts that lost their keels.

In December 2008, the high speed experimental sailing hydrofoil trimaran Hydroptère set a world speed record, then pitchpoled while going over 60 knots. The turtled yacht had to be towed back to port for being turned right side up.

In the 2011 Chicago Yacht Club Race to Mackinac, the high performance monohull sportsyacht WingNuts, a Kiwi 35, turtled in an extreme storm, killing the captain and one crew member.  Later inquiry determined the boatspecifically its high performance extremely wide low displacement hullwas unfit for the location, weather, and the lengthy multiday race format, and urged race officials to change ratings and revoke privileges for similar boats to enter the race. The waves were not all that unusual, although the wind was. The boat may have buried one of its hiking wings into a wave, causing it to 'trip', and had the other lifted by the wind. It is rare but not unheard of for keelboats to turtle and remain upside down, particularly if its keel is intact. However, this boat's unique hull form, which made it very fast, also rendered it more stable upside down than right side up. This was a recipe for the disaster. This loss was occasioned despite a competent and experienced crew which was as well equipped and prepared as thought to be necessary. WingNuts met then current offshore stability standards, which failed to adequately take into account the dynamic effect of the "radical" winged hull.

On 13 June 2012, in the trials leading to the America's Cup, Oracle Team USA on an AC45 spectacularly capsized the boat, and it was righted with minimal damage ("there's a little rip there") ten minutes later. Skipper Russell Coutts dismissed it as "a learning experience". This was an epilogue to earlier similar incidents by other teams in Australia.

On 9 May 2013, the 2013 America's Cup challenger Artemis broke apart, broached, capsized, and turtled destroying its wing/sail and trapping two crew members under its hull.  The AC72 wing-sail catamaran was sailed on behalf of the Royal Swedish Yacht Club, sponsoring Team Artemis. Andrew "Bart" Simpson, an Olympic-gold-medal winning British sailor, died as a result.

Legal implications
Capsize and turtling can result in legal liability for damages due to negligence.

See also

Angle of loll
Broach (nautical)
Capsizing
Death roll
Drogue
Kayak roll
keeling over
Limit of positive stability
Metacentric height
Naval architecture
Ship stability
Weight distribution

References

Footnotes

Endnotes

Sources
 at Internet Archive
 

 

  
 
 

 

 including a picture of the turtled Lugnuts

Further reading

External links

Nautical terminology